In genealogy, pedigree collapse describes how reproduction between two individuals who share an ancestor causes the number of distinct ancestors in the family tree of their offspring to be smaller than it could otherwise be. Robert C. Gunderson coined the term; synonyms include implex and the German Ahnenschwund (loosely translated: "loss of lineage").

Overview 
Without pedigree collapse, a person's ancestor tree is a binary tree, formed by the person, the parents (2), the grandparents (4), great-grandparents (8), and so on. However, the number of individuals in such a tree grows exponentially and will eventually become impossibly high. For example, a single individual alive today would, over 30 generations going back to the High Middle Ages, have 230 or roughly 1 billion ancestors, more than the total world population at the time.

This paradox is explained by shared ancestors, referred to as pedigree collapse. Instead of consisting of all different individuals, a tree may have multiple places occupied by a single individual. This typically happens when the parents of an ancestor are related to each other (sometimes unbeknownst to themselves). For example, the offspring of two first cousins has at most only six great-grandparents instead of the usual eight. This reduction in the number of ancestors is pedigree collapse. It collapses the ancestor tree into a directed acyclic graph.

In some cultures, cousins and other relations were permitted, encouraged, or required to marry. This may have been to keep kin bonds, wealth and property within a family (endogamy) or simply because there was a limited number of potential marriage partners available. Among royalty, the frequent requirement to marry only other royals resulted in a reduced gene pool in which most individuals were the result of extensive pedigree collapse. Alfonso XII of Spain, for example, had only four great-grandparents instead of the usual eight. Furthermore, two of these great-grandparents, Charles IV of Spain and Maria Luisa of Parma, who themselves were first cousins, were parents of another great-grandparent, Maria Isabella of Spain. Essentially, Alfonso’s parents were double first cousins, i.e. his two grandfathers were brothers and his two grandmothers were sisters, meaning there were only two sets of great-grandparents rather than four. In addition each grandfather had married one of their sister’s daughters, i.e. they had each married their sororal niece.

More generally, in many cultures intermarriage may frequently occur within a small village, limiting the available gene pool.

Ancestry

The House of Habsburg gives a well-documented example of pedigree collapse. In the case of Charles II, the last Habsburg King of Spain, there were three uncle-niece marriages among the seven unions of his immediate ancestry (i.e. parents, grandparents and great-grandparents). His father and two of his great-grandfathers married their nieces. His paternal grandparents were first cousins once removed, but they comprised two of the seven marriages because they were also parents to his maternal grandmother. His maternal grandparents' marriage and the final marriage of great-grandparents was between first cousins.

The maximum pedigree collapse of 50% within a single generation is caused by procreation between full siblings; such children have only two different grandparents instead of the usual four. If two half-siblings procreate, their children have three grandparents instead of four (25%).

If a child and parent were to procreate, their offspring would have four grandparents; so, procreation between parents and children would result in less pedigree collapse than procreation between full siblings – although one of the grandparents would also be a parent and therefore introduce no additional genes.

If a person procreates with a full sibling of one of their parents (as with the uncle-niece marriages mentioned above), the offspring have four different persons as grandparents, and eight great-grandparents, but again some of these contribute no additional genes (see Inbreeding).

Small, isolated populations such as those of remote islands represent extreme examples of pedigree collapse, but the common historical tendency to marry those within walking distance, due to the relative immobility of the population before modern transport, meant that most marriage partners were at least distantly related. Even in America around the 19th century, the tendency of immigrants to marry among their ethnic, language or cultural group produced many cousin marriages.

If one considers as a function of time  the number of a given individual's ancestors who were alive at time , it is likely that for most individuals this function has a maximum at around 1200 AD. It was suggested in 1985 that everyone on Earth is at most 50th cousin to everyone else, based on a relatively random mating model. Simulations published in 2004 which take into account the geographical separations and less random patterns of mating in real life suggest that some populations are separated by up to a few thousand years, with a most recent common ancestor perhaps 76 generations back, though some highly remote populations may have been isolated for somewhat longer.

See also 

 Coefficient of relationship
 Consanguinity
 Cousin marriage
 Galton–Watson process
 Haplotype
 Identical ancestors point
 I'm My Own Grandpa
 Inbreeding
 Most recent common ancestor
 The Seven Daughters of Eve

Notes

References

External links
 "How many ancestors do you have?" by Stephen Lewis, The Wild Peak, March 4, 2012

Genealogy
Incest
Kinship and descent
Marriage
Population genetics
Last common ancestors